HaHalom HaEfshari (lit. The Possible Dream) is the seventh studio album by the Israeli singer Dana International, released in 2002 on the IMP Records label with the catalogue number IMP 2104.

The Possible Dream includes two titles sung in English, "Gotta Move On" and "Superman", and the Israeli single releases "'Ad HaYom" ("To This Day"), the title track "HaHalom HaEfshari" ("The Possible Dream"), "Makát Chom ('Ey La Dir La Da Da)" ("Heatstroke"), a cover of a classic 1970s hit single by legendary Italian/Egyptian/French entertainer Dalida then titled "Darladirladada",  "Sipur Katzar", "Tachlom" ("Dream On"), "Tagíd Li Mi" ("Tell Me Who"), a cover version of "Storie di Tutti i Giorni" by the Italian singer Riccardo Fogli and "Yihye Tov" ("I'll Be Fine") although some of these were only issued as promotional singles. The album was released in two versions, one in a regular jewel case and the second in a card sleeve. The track lists are identical.

In 2003, a limited edition 8-CD box set, The CDs Collection, was released, with only 2,000 copies being made. The 18 track box set included seven of the Possible Dream singles, some previously never commercially available, with the eighth disc being the non-album release "AloRaroLa".

Track listing
Note: The English translations of the song titles are given here for informational purposes only.
"'Ad Hayom" ("To This Day [Until Today]") - 4:06
"Takhlom" ("Dream On") (Radio Edit) - 3:43
"Tagid Li Mi" ("Tell Me Who") - 3:29
"Makat Khom" ("'Ey La Dir La Da Da") ("Heatstroke") - 2:59
"HaKhalom HaEfshari" ("The Possible Dream") - 3:20
"Yihye T'ov" ("I'll Be Fine") - 3:30
"Raq Lo Hayom" ("But Not Today") - 3:38
"Gotta Move On" - 3:45
"Superman" - 4:12
"Sipur Qatzar" (Short Story)- 3:51
"Nitzakhti" ("I Won") (Acoustic Version) - 3:07
"Yihye T'ov" ("I'll Be Fine") (S.T.E.R.N. Remix) - 6:09
"Takhlom" ("Dream On") (Zigo Remix) - 6:31

External links
 Official Dana International site with discography details
 Unofficial Dana International site with discography details
 Rateyourmusic.com discography
 Discogs.com discography

Dana International albums
2002 albums